Fluoroestradiol F-18, also known as [18F]16α-fluoroestradiol and sold under the brand name Cerianna, is a radioactive diagnostic agent indicated for use with positron emission tomography (PET) imaging. It is an analog of estrogen and is used to detect estrogen receptor-positive breast cancer lesions.

Chemistry
Chemically, fluoroestradiol F-18 is [18F]16α-fluoro-3,17β-diol-estratriene-1,3,5(10).

History
Fluoroestradiol F-18 was approved for medical use in the United States in May 2020.

See also
 4-Fluoroestradiol

References

External links
 
 

Secondary alcohols
Estradiol
Estranes
Estrogens
Medicinal radiochemistry
PET radiotracers
Phenols
Radiopharmaceuticals
Organofluorides
Breast cancer